Adetomyrma cassis (from Latin cassis, "helm", referring to the shape of its genital capsule) is a species of ant endemic to Madagascar.

Description
Adetomyrma cassis is only known from a single male collected in the Ambatovaky Reserve, Madagascar. The male of A. cassis is distinguished easily from other Adetomyrma males by a distinct and flatted projection on the posterior portion of the paramere. This projection is not separated from the paramere by a deep notch as in A. bressleri. This genital character observed in Adetomyrma cassis is completely unique and sufficient to regard this male as a distinct species.

References

Amblyoponinae
Blind animals
Insects described in 2012
Hymenoptera of Africa
Endemic fauna of Madagascar